Malcolm Isaiah Shaw (born July 27, 1995) is a Canadian professional soccer player who plays as a forward for Canadian Premier League club Atlético Ottawa.

Early life
Shaw played youth soccer with Pickering FC and Power Soccer Academy. During his college off-seasons, he trained with League1 Ontario club Master's FA.

College career
In 2013, he began attending Roberts Wesleyan College, where he played for the men's soccer team. On September 9, 2014, he scored his first collegiate goal against the Pitt–Johnstown Mountain Cats. In 2015, he was named to the NCCAA All-Midwest Region Second Team. On September 4, 2016, he scored a brace against the Chestnut Hill Griffins.
In 2015, Shaw was named to the NCCAA All-Midwest Region Second Team and the ECC All-Conference Second Team. On October 26, 2016, he scored a hat trick in a 5-2 victory over the Pitt–Johnstown Mountain Cats. In 2016, he was named to the National Soccer Coaches Association of America All-East Region All-American Third Team and the ECC All-Conference Second Team. He led the team in scoring in both his junior and senior seasons in 2015 and 2016. Over his time with the Redhawks, he scored 27 goals in 73 appearances in four seasons.

While at Roberts Wesleyan, Shaw also represented the school in track & field in the javelin competition. He finished in 15th place at the 2016 NCAA Division II Track and Field Championships.

Club career
In 2017, he played with National Premier Soccer League club Erie Commodores FC. He scored three goals during the season, helping Erie win the East Conference Division. He was named to the 2017 NPSL Midwest Conference East Division Second Team Best XI.

In 2018, Shaw joined Råslätts SK in the Swedish fourth tier. He scored his first goal on April 21, in a 2-0 victory over Hässleholms IF.

In February 2019, he signed with Assyriska IK in the third tier Ettan Södra. On May 30, he scored his first goals for the club, netting both goals in a 2-0 victory over Landskrona.

In 2020, he was set to move to IFK Värnamo, however, due to the COVID-19 pandemic, that move was not able to be completed. He was then set to set to the United States to trial with a USL club in Nebraska, however, he was unable to enter the country as his US passport did not arrive on time and he instead returned to Canada.

In June 2020, he signed a contract with Canadian Premier League expansion club Atlético Ottawa, after initially joining the club on a trial, after the club came across his profile on Transfermarkt. He scored a goal in his debut for the club on August 15 in a 2-2 draw against York9 FC. He helped Ottawa record their first ever victory, scoring a long-distance strike in a 2-0 victory over Cavalry FC, on August 27, 2020. He was a leading figure of the CPL player-led Black Lives Matter showing of solidarity that season. In January 2021, he re-signed with the club. On July 21, 2021, Shaw scored a brace against Pacific FC. On August 14, 2021, Shaw scored Ottawa's first ever goal at their home stadium against HFX Wanderers FC. In 2021, he led the team in scoring with 10 goals, also leading the team in shots and shots on target. Shaw was named the Capital City Supporters Group Golden Scarf winner as their player of the season for 2021. In January 2022, he once again extended his contract, signing for an additional two seasons, with a club option for 2024.

Career statistics

References

External links

Malcolm Shaw Statistics at Lagstatistik

1995 births
Living people
Association football forwards
Canadian soccer players
Soccer people from Ontario
People from Pickering, Ontario
Canadian expatriate soccer players
Expatriate soccer players in the United States
Canadian expatriate sportspeople in the United States
Expatriate footballers in Sweden
Canadian expatriate sportspeople in Sweden
Roberts Wesleyan University alumni
Atlético Ottawa players
Division 2 (Swedish football) players
Ettan Fotboll players
Canadian Premier League players
College men's soccer players in the United States
National Premier Soccer League players